John Forbes (1800-25 December 1874) was a Presbyterian minister who served in St Paul's Church in Glasgow. After several years in the Church of Scotland left at the Disruption and joined the Free Church of Scotland.

Life

John Forbes was born in Dunkeld in 1800. In 1828 he was educated at Perth Academy and St Andrews University. After graduation he was for sometime employed as a mathematical tutor in Perth Academy. Forbes was licensed by the Presbytery of Perth on 27 April 1825. He was subsequently ordained to Hope Park Chapel (Newington), Edinburgh, on 16 November 1826. In this role Forbes succeeded Robert Gordon whom he had previously succeeded as mathematics master in Perth Academy. He later moved to Glasgow being presented by Magistrates and Council on 10 September, and translated, and admitted on 18 December 1828. He was awarded a doctorate D.D. from the University of St Andrews, on 15 April 1837. He also received an LL.D. from Glasgow University, on 18 December 1840. At the Disruption he joined the Free Church in 1843 and served as minister of St Paul's Free Church, from 1843-1874. He was a member of the Assembly of 1863, made a long speech on the Union question, and accepted a place in the Committee. He died unmarried, on 25 December 1874.

Publications

The  Theory of the Differential and Integral Calculus (Glasgow, 1837)
Three Sermons on the Lord's Day (1831)
Lectures I. (On the Headship of Christ), II. (The  Jews), XL (On  Infidelity), XII. (On  the  Evidences)
On the Social and Physical Condition of the People)

References

Citations

Sources

 

19th-century Ministers of the Free Church of Scotland
1800 births
1874 deaths
Alumni of the University of St Andrews